The 2012 Women's Masters Basel were held from October 12 to 14 at the Curlingzentrum Region Basel in Basel, Switzerland as part of the 2012–13 World Curling Tour. The event was held in a triple knockout format, and the purse for the event was 32,000 CHF, of which the winner, Margaretha Sigfridsson, received 10,000 CHF. Sigfridsson won her second straight Women's Masters Basel title with a 6–3 win over Silvana Tirinzoni in the final.

Teams
The teams are listed as follows:

Knockout results
The draw is listed as follows:

A event

B event

C event

Playoffs

References

External links

2012 in curling